= Free program =

Free program may refer to:

- Free software
- Free skating
